"Slowly" is a 1954 song by Webb Pierce, written by Pierce and Nashville songwriter Tommy Hill (brother of singer Goldie Hill).

Background
Beyond its success as a song, "Slowly" was hugely influential in the history of country music, in that it was among the first (and certainly the most successful to date) songs to feature a pedal steel guitar. The song's iconic intro, played by Bud Isaacs, was said to have sent legions of lap steel guitar players scurrying to their closets for wire coat hangers, with which they attempted to modify their existing instruments to get the pitch shifting effect achieved by Isaacs.

Chart performance
The song was one of Pierce's more successful singles, spending seventeen weeks at the top of the Country and Western Best Sellers lists and a total of thirty-six weeks in the chart.

Cover versions
On August 23, 1966, Connie Smith recorded the song which appeared on her album Connie in the Country (1967) 
In 1968, Jimmy Martin recorded the song which appeared in the album “Free-born Man” (1969)
In 1971, Jimmy Dean and Dottie West recorded a duet of the song, which hit the Top 40 on the country charts
In 1981, Kippi Brannon had her sole hit on the country charts with her version of the song
In 2014, The Haden Triplets (Petra, Tanya and Rachel), daughters of jazz double-bassist Charlie Haden, recorded the song for their debut album on Jack White's Third Man Records.

References
 

1954 songs
Webb Pierce songs
Songs written by Webb Pierce